The Black River is a tributary of the White River, about  long, in southeastern Missouri and northeastern Arkansas in the United States.  Via the White River, it is part of the Mississippi River watershed.  Black River Technical College is named for the river.

The river was so named on account of the black tint of its water.

Headwaters and course

The Black River rises in Missouri as three streams:
The East Fork Black River rises in Iron County and flows generally southwardly, through Johnson's Shut-Ins State Park where the Taum Sauk pumped storage plant Upper Reservoir dam breach caused severe damage to the park.  A dam on the East Fork forms  the Taum Sauk Lower Reservoir which holds water that is pumped to the Upper Reservoir.
The Middle Fork Black River is formed by a confluence of creeks in the Mark Twain National Forest in northern Reynolds County and flows generally southeastwardly.
The West Fork Black River is formed by a confluence of creeks in the Mark Twain National Forest in western Reynolds County and flows generally eastwardly, past the town of Centerville.

The headwaters forks converge near Lesterville, and the Black River flows generally southwardly through Reynolds, Wayne and Butler Counties in Missouri; and Clay, Randolph and Lawrence Counties in Arkansas.  In its lowermost course the river is used to define the boundary between Independence and Jackson Counties.  It flows past the towns of Mill Spring, Williamsville and Poplar Bluff in Missouri; and Pocahontas, Black Rock, and Powhatan in Arkansas.  It joins the White River at Jacksonport, Arkansas.

Dams
A U.S. Army Corps of Engineers dam in Wayne County, Missouri, causes the river to form Clearwater Lake.

Tributaries
In Arkansas, the Black River is joined by the Little Black River, the Current River, the Spring River and the Strawberry River. Mayberry Branch is a tributary in Missouri.

See also
List of Arkansas rivers
List of Missouri rivers

References

External links

Rivers of Arkansas
Rivers of Missouri
Bodies of water of the Ozarks
Tributaries of the White River (Arkansas–Missouri)
Bodies of water of Clay County, Arkansas
Rivers of Randolph County, Arkansas
Bodies of water of Lawrence County, Arkansas
Bodies of water of Independence County, Arkansas
Bodies of water of Jackson County, Arkansas
Rivers of Iron County, Missouri
Rivers of Wayne County, Missouri
Rivers of Butler County, Missouri
Rivers of Reynolds County, Missouri